John Johnstone Wallack (January 1, 1820, New York City – September 6, 1888, Stamford, Connecticut), was an American actor-manager and son of James William Wallack and Susan Johnstone. He used the stage name John Lester until October 5, 1858, when he first acted under the name Lester Wallack, which he retained the rest of his career.

Biography
He was born in New York but at an early age he was taken to his parents' home in London where he was reared and educated. His mother was also an actress Susan Johnstone and his father was James William Wallack a theatre producer. He had chosen a military career but became discouraged and went to Dublin where he went upon the stage. He remained for two seasons and then went to Edinburgh. Then in 1846, he appeared in London at the Haymarket Theatre under Benjamin Webster's management. There he was seen by George H. Barrett, who had come to London to engage actors for the Broadway Theatre, in New York.

He made his American debut there in 1847, under the name of John Lester, appearing as Sir Charles Coldstream in Boucicault's adaptation of Used Up. His father's brother, Henry Wallack, the father of James William Wallack Jr. (1818–1873), was also in the Broadway Theatre's company. His second appearance was as Viscount de Ligny in Captain of the Guard by James Planché.

Subsequently, he performed at the Bowery Theatre, Burton's Theatre, Niblo's Garden and the first Wallack's Theatre. His first appearance at the Bowery Theatre was in 1849 as Don Caesar de Bazan by Adolphe d'Ennery and Philippe Dumanoir.

He was manager of the second Wallack's Theatre from 1861 (demolished in 1901), and in 1882 he opened the third at 30th Street and Broadway (demolished in 1915). Among the productions staged at the latter was Margaret Mather's ill-fated production of Cymbeline in 1897. Another Wallack's Theatre, at 254 West 42nd Street in New York, was named for him in 1924. Wallack joined The Lambs in 1875, which frequently met at Wallack's Theater. He served as its Shepherd (president): 1878-1879, 1880-1882. 1884-1888, and was one of the founders of the Actors' Fund of America.

His greatest successes were as Charles Surface, as Benedick, and especially as Elliot Grey in his own play Rosedale, and similar light comedy and romantic parts, for which his fascinating manners and handsome person well fitted him. He married a sister (d. 1909) of Sir John Millais. He wrote his own Memories of Fifty Years.

Notes

References

Attribution:

Further reading

Florence, W. J. (1888-10). “Lester Wallack”. The North American Review, Vol. 147 No. 383, pp. 453–459. Online at JSTOR.
Moses, Montrose J. (1906). Famous Actor-Families in America. Thomas Y. Crowell & Company, New York, pp. 195–224. Online at Internet Archive.
Wallack, Lester and Hutton, Laurence (1889). Memories of Fifty Years. Charles Scribner’s Sons, New York
Winter, William (1889). Brief Chronicles, Part I. Publications of the Dunlap Society, No. 7, New York, pp. 313–23

External links

 
 Theater Arts Manuscripts: An Inventory of the Collection at the Harry Ransom Center

1820 births
1888 deaths
American autobiographers
Male actors from New York City
19th-century American male actors
American male stage actors
The Lambs presidents
Members of The Lambs Club
Actor-managers